Gopikandar is a village in the Gopikandar CD block in the Dumka Sadar subdivision of the Dumka district in the Indian state of Jharkhand.

Geography

Location

Overview
The map shows a large area, which is a plateau with low hills, except in the eastern portion where the Rajmahal hills intrude into this area and the Ramgarh hills are there. The south-western portion is just a rolling upland. The entire area is overwhelmingly rural with only small pockets of urbanisation.

Note: The full screen map is interesting. All places marked on the map are linked in the full screen map and one can easily move on to another page of his/her choice. Enlarge the full screen map to see what else is there – one gets railway connections, many more road connections and so on.

Area

Demographics
According to the 2011 Census of India, Gopikandar had a total population of 1,293, of which 654 (51%) were males and 639 (49%) were females. Population in the age range 0–6 years was 186. The total number of literate persons in Gopikandar was 1,107 (64.77% of the population over 6 years).

Civic administration

Police station
There is a police station at Gopikandar.

CD block HQ
Headquarters of Gopikandar CD block is at Gopikandar village.

Education
Kasturba Gandhi Balika Vidyalaya, Gopikandar, is a Hindi-medium girls only institution established in 2005. It has facilities for teaching from class VI to class XII.

Government High School Gopikandar is a Hindi-medium coeducational institution established in 1960. It has facilities for teaching from class I to class XII.

Project Girls High School Gopikandar is a Hindi-medium girls only institution established in 1984. It has facilities for teaching from class VI to class X.

St. Aloysius High School is a Hindi-medium boys only institution established in 1954. It has facilities for teaching from class I to class X.

References

Villages in Dumka district